Seyed Nasser Emadi (born 1969) is an Iranian physician. He is a volunteer physician and a member of Médecins Sans Frontières (MSF). He won the Florence Nightingale Medal 2021, which recognizes exceptional courage and devotion to victims of armed conflict or natural disaster.

Early life
In 1969, Emadi was born in Qaem Shahr, Mazandaran Province, Iran.

Career
In 1994, Emadi received an M.D. from the Babol University of Medical Sciences in Babol, Mazandaran Province, Iran. He completed his training in dermatology at the Tehran University of Medical Sciences In 2004.
He has worked as a doctor in field projects in Iraq, Afghanistan,Burundi, Kenya, Ghana, Kenya, Tanzania, Zimbabwe, Guinea and Somalia.
He is a faculty member at Tehran University of Medical Sciences.

Honours
He won the Florence Nightingale Medal 2021, which recognizes exceptional courage and devotion to victims of armed conflict or natural disaster.

References 

Tehran University of Medical Sciences alumni
Iranian physicians
1969 births
Iranian humanitarians
20th-century Iranian physicians
Living people
Médecins Sans Frontières
People from Qaem Shahr